Kumaon (Kumaoni: Kumāū; ; historically romanized as Kemāon) is a revenue and administrative division in the Indian State of Uttarakhand. It spans over the eastern half of the state and is bounded on the north by Tibet, on the east by Nepal, on the south by the state of Uttar Pradesh, and on the west by Garhwal. Kumaon comprises six districts of the state: Almora, Bageshwar, Champawat, Nainital, Pithoragarh and Udham Singh Nagar.

Historically known as Manaskhand and then Kurmanchal, the Kumaon region has been ruled by several Hindu dynasties over the course of history; most notably the Katyuris and the Chands. The Kumaon division was established in 1816, when the British reclaimed this region from the Gorkhas, who had annexed the erstwhile Kingdom of Kumaon in 1790. It was formed into a division of what was then called Ceded and Conquered Provinces, later known as United Provinces. In independent India the state was called Uttar Pradesh. In 2000, the new state of Uttarakhand was carved out of Uttar Pradesh, including Kumaon.

The people of Kumaon are known as Kumaonis and speak the Kumaoni language. Kumaon is home to a famous Indian Army regiment, the Kumaon Regiment. The hill town Nainital is its administrative centre and this is where the Uttarakhand high court is located. Other notable hill towns of Kumaon are Almora, Ranikhet, Pithoragarh, Champawat and Bageshwar. However, all the major cities of the region like Ramnagar, Haldwani, Rudrapur and Kashipur,Tanakpur 
are concentrated in the southern plain areas of Bhabar and Terai.

Etymology 
Kumaon is believed to have been derived from Kurmanchal, meaning the land of the Kurmavatar (the tortoise incarnation of Lord Vishnu, the preserver according to Hinduism). The region of Kumaon is named after as such.

According to another theory the word Kumaon can be traced back to the 5th century BC. The Kassite Assyrians left their homeland Kummah, on the banks of river Euphrates, and settled in the northern part of India.

During this time of the British control of the region, between 1815 and 1857 it was also known as Kemaon.

Geography 

The Kumaon region consists of a large Himalayan tract, together with two submontane strips called the Terai and the Bhabar. The submontane strips were up to 1850 an almost impenetrable forest, given up to wild animals; but after 1850 the numerous clearings attracted a large population from the hills, who cultivated the rich soil during the hot and cold seasons, returning to the hills in the rains. The rest of Kumaon is a maze of mountains, part of the Himalaya range, some of which are among the loftiest known. In a tract not more than 225 km in length and 65 km in breadth there are over thirty peaks rising to elevations exceeding 5500 m.

Rivers such as Gori, Dhauli, and Kali rise chiefly in the southern slope of the Tibetan watershed north of the loftiest peaks, amongst which they make their way down valleys of rapid declivity and extraordinary depth. The principal is the Sharda (Kali Ganga), the Pindari and Kailganga, whose waters join the Alaknanda. The river Sharda (Kali Ganga) forms the international boundary between India and Nepal. The pilgrim route currently used to visit Kailash-Mansarovar goes along this river and crosses into Tibet at Lipu Lekh pass.

The chief trees are the chir pine, Himalayan cypress, pindrow fir, alder, sal and saindan. Limestone, sandstone, slate, gneiss and granite constitute the principal geological formations. Mines of iron, copper, gypsum, lead and asbestos exist, but they are not thoroughly worked. Except in the submontane strips and deep valleys, the climate is mild. The rainfall of the outer Himalayan range, which is first struck by the monsoon, is double that of the central hills, in the average proportion of 2000 mm to 1000 mm. No winter passes without snow on the higher ridges, and in some years, it is universal throughout the mountain tract. Frosts, especially in the valleys, are often severe.

History
Prehistoric dwellings and Stone Age implements have been discovered in Almora and Nainital districts. Initially settled by Kol tribals, the region witnessed successive waves of Kiratas, Khasas and Indo-Scythians. Kunindas were the first rulers of the region. They were followed by the Katyuri kings of Khasha origin who controlled the region from 700 to 1200 AD.

Around 1100–1200 AD, after Katyuri kingdom disintegration, Kurmanchal was divided into eight different principalities: Baijnath-Katyur, Dwarhat, Doti, Baramandal, Askot, Sira, Sora, Sui. Around 1581 AD, under Rudra Chand, the whole region was brought together again as Kumaon.

Kumaon Kingdom

Katyuri Raj

The Katyuri dynasty was a ruling Hindu dynasty of Khasha origin and was founded by Vashudev Katyuri. they established their kingdom and called it Kurmanchal kingdom, they dominated lands of varying extent from the 'Katyur' (modern day Baijnath) valley in Kumaon, between 7th and 11th centuries AD, and established their capital at Baijnath in Bageshwar district, which was then known as Kartikeyapura and lies in the centre of 'Katyur' valley. Brahmadev mandi in Kanchanpur District of far western Nepal was established by Katyuri king Brahma Deo, At their peak, the kurmanchal kingdom of Katyuri kings was extended from Sikkim in the east to Kabul, Afghanistan in the west, before fragmenting into numerous principalities by the 12th century.

it is believed that from king Dham Deo and Bir Deo the downfall of this powerful dynasty began. Birdeo used to collect heavy taxes and forced his people to work as his slaves, King Birdeo teased his subjects by his tyranny to the extent that he forcibly married his own maternal aunt Tila. It is said that the Kumaoni folk song Mami tile dharo bola became popular from that very day. after death of Birdeo the kingdom was divided between his eight sons and they were able to form their different small kingdoms in the region for a short period of time until Chands emerged in the region defeating most of katyuri principalities and united Kurmanchal again as Kumaon.

The Rajwar dynasty of Askot in Pithoragarh, was set up in 1279 AD, by a branch of the Katyuri kings, headed by Abhay Pal Deo, who was the grandson of Katyuri king Brahma Deo. The dynasty ruled the region until it became part of the British Raj through the treaty of Sighauli in 1816.

Chand Raj

The Chand dynasty was established by Som Chand in the 10th century, by displacing the Katyuri Kings, who had been ruling the area from the 7th century AD. He continued to call his state Kurmanchal and established its capital in Champawat in Kali Kumaon called so, due to its vicinity to river Kali. Many temples built in this former capital city, during the 11th and 12th century exist today, this includes the Baleshwar and Nagnath temples.

One of the most powerful rulers of Chand dynasty was Baz Bahadur (1638–78) AD, who met Shahjahan in Delhi, and in 1655 joined forces with him to attack Garhwal, which was then under the King Pirthi Sah. Baz Bahadur subsequently captured the Terai region including Dehradun, which was thus separated from the Garhwal kingdom. Baz Bahadur extended his territory east to Karnali river, later Baz Bahadur invaded Tibet and captured several forts including a Hindu pilgrim Kailash Manasarovar. he also built the Golu Devata Temple, at Ghorakhal, near Bhimtal, after Lord Golu, a general in his army, who died valiantly in battle. He also built the famous Bhimeshwara Mahadev Temple at Bhimtal.

Towards the end of the 17th century, Chand kings again attacked the Garhwal kingdom, and in 1688, Udyot Chand erected several temples at Almora, including Tripur Sundari, Udyot Chandeshwar, and Parbateshwar. To mark his victory over Garhwal and Doti, the Parbateshwar temple was renamed twice, to become the present Nanda Devi temple. Later, Jagat Chand (1708–20), defeated the Raja of Garhwal and pushed him away from Srinagar (in Uttarakhand, not to be confused with the capital of present-day Indian Kashmir), and his kingdom was given to a Brahmin.

Nepalese invasion and its defeat

In the latter half of the 18th century, the power of Kumaon was on decline, as the king Mahendra Chand was unable to properly administer the country. After the fall of Doti, the Gorkhas decided to invade over Kumaon. The Gorkha forces, under the leadership of Amar Singh Thapa crossed the kali river, and reached Almora via Sor and Gangoli. Mahendra Chand fled to the plains, and Kumaon was easily annexed to the Gorkha Kingdom.

The Gorkha rule over Kumaon lasted for 24 years. The  architectural advancements during the period was a road connecting kali river to Srinagar via Almora. Almora was the largest town of Kumaon during the gorkha period, and is estimated to have about 1000 houses.

After the Gorkhas started meddling in the territories of Oudh, the Nawab of Oudh, who was then a suzerain of the British Empire, asked for their help, thus paving way for the Anglo-Nepalese War of 1814. The British forces under Colonel Nicholas, consisting of about forty five hundred men and six pounder guns, entered Kumaon through Kashipur and conquered Almora on 26 April 1815. On the same day, Chandra Bahadur Shah, one of the principle Gurkha chiefs, sent a flag of truce, requesting to end hostilities in the region. A negotiation was brought up the following day, under which the Gurkhas agreed to leave the Country, and all its fortified places. The war ended with Nepal signing the Treaty of Sugauli in 1816, under which, Kumaon officially became a British territory.

British Raj

Later, the region was annexed by the British. In 1815 the Kumaon region was joined with the eastern half of the Garhwal region as a chief-commissionership on the non-regulation system, also known as the Kumaon Province. It was governed for seventy years by three administrators, Mr. Traill, Mr. J. H. Batten and Sir Henry Ramsay.

There was widespread opposition against British rule in various parts of Kumaon. The Kumaoni people especially Champawat District rose in rebellion against the British during the Indian Rebellion of 1857 under the leadership of the members like Kalu Singh Mahara. In 1891 the division was composed of the three districts of Kumaon, Garhwal and the Tarai; but the two districts of Kumaon and the Tarai were subsequently redistributed and renamed after their headquarters, Nainital and Almora.

The area received international attention after the publication of Man-Eaters of Kumaon, by Jim Corbett, the noted hunter and conservationist, describing the author's trials seeking out and killing man-eating tigers. Animals like the Champawat Tiger and the Chowgarh Tigers plagued the area for many years, with the former estimated to have killed over four hundred humans by herself, in Nepal and then Kumaon, in the years 1920–28.

Mahatma Gandhi's advent sounded a death knell for the British in Kumaon. People now aware of the excesses of British Raj became defiant of it and played an active part in the Indian Struggle for Independence. While staying in Kumaon for 12 days, recovering from the rigors of imprisonment, Gandhi wrote Anashakti Yoga, his commentary on the Gita.

Gandhi was revered in these parts and on his call the struggle of Salam Saliya Satyagraha led by Ram Singh Dhoni was started which shook the very roots of British rule in Kumaon.
Many people died in the Saalam Satyagraha due to police brutality. Gandhi named it the Bardoli of Kumaon an allusion to the Bardoli Satyagrah. Many Kumaonis also joined the Indian National Army led by Netaji Subhash Chandra Bose.

Independent India 
After India became independent in 1947, United Provinces were converted into the newly formed Indian state of Uttar Pradesh. The princely state of Tehri Garhwal joined the Indian Union in 1949, and became a district under the Kumaon division. Three new districts viz. Pithoragarh from Almora, Chamoli from Garhwal and Uttarkashi from Tehri Garhwal were created in 1960. A new revenue division, named Uttarakhand division was carved out from these 3 districts of Kumaon division.

The year 1969 saw major administrative reforms in these hilly regions of Uttar Pradesh, and a new Garhwal division, with its headquarter in Pauri, was formed with the districts of Tehri Garhwal and Garhwal from Kumaon division, and Uttarkashi and Chamoli from Uttarakhand division. The Uttarakhand division too was disestablished the same year, and the remaining district of Pithoragarh was brought back to Kumaon division, hence giving it its present size.

Three new districts were created in the 90's, taking the total number of districts in the division to 6. Udham singh nagar from Nainital in 1995, and Bageshwar from Almora and Champawat from Pithoragarh in 1997. Two new districts, Ranikhet from Almora and Didihat from Pithoragarh were announced in 2011 by the then Chief minister of Uttarakhand, Ramesh Pokhriyal, but the districts never came into existence because no official notification was ever released.

Culture

Traditional attire

Pichaura (पिछोङा) is a traditional attire worn by married Kumaoni women generally for religious occasions, marriage, and other rituals. Traditionally handmade using vegetable dyes, Pichhauras are available in red and saffron. Local designs made in Almora, Haldwani and other parts of Kumaon use silk fabric and accessories made of pearl. It is also contemporarily made using machines.
In recent years its popularity has seen a rise, especially in Kumaoni diaspora in other states and countries.

Kumaoni men do wear a Kumaoni cap, which is of black colour. However, during festivals, especially during Kumauni Holi the cap becomes white in colour.

Folk Art
Aipan is the most famous folk art of Kumaon. In recent times its popularity has grown. 
Aipan is not only an important folk art of Kumaoni community but other ethnic groups of Kumaon, like Shaukas and Rungs, as well. Hence it also acts as a cultural link between different ethnic communities of Kumaon, therefore has significant importance.

Folk dances
Many classical dance forms and folk art are practised in the Kumaon. Some well-known dances include Hurkiya Baul, Jhora-Chanchri and Chholiya. Music is an integral part of the Kumaoni culture. Popular types of folk songs include Mangal and Nyoli. These folk songs are played on instruments including dhol, damau, turri, ransingha, dholki, daur, thali, bhankora, mandan and mashakbaja. A famous Kumaoni folk is Bedu Pako. Music is also used as a medium through which the gods are invoked. Jagar is a form of spirit worship in which the singer, or Jagariya, sings a ballad of the gods, with allusions to great epics, like Mahabharat and Ramayana, that describe the adventures and exploits of the god being invoked.

Kumaoni Ram Leela is the oldest in the world. It is 150-year-old, due to which UNESCO has declared it world's longest-running opera. In addition, the Kumaoni Ram Leela is now a part of the World Cultural Heritage List. With the passage of time, people have experimented with the show, yet the oral traditional has stayed as it always was. This is to say that the Ram Leela in Kumaon is not a staged performance; rather, it is a musical fest, which is made special by the beats of instruments like harmonium, dholak and table. In Kumaon's Ram Leela, the focus is more on singing than acting.

Kumaoni holi is the historical and cultural celebration of the Hindu festival of Holi. It is one of the most important festivals for the Kumauni people as it signifies not only the victory of good over evil but also end of the winter season and the start of the new sowing season which holds great importance for this agricultural community of the North Indian Himalayas. It is an amalgamation of the cultural traditions of North India and the local traditions of Kumaon. The uniqueness of the Kumaoni Holi lies in its being a musical affair, whatever its form, be it the Baithki Holi, the Khari Holi and the Mahila Holi all of which start from Basant Panchmi. 
This results in the festivities of Holi lasting for almost two months in Kumaon. The Baithki Holi and Khari Holi are unique in that the songs on which they are based have a combination of melody, fun, and spiritualism. These songs are essentially based on classical ragas. Baithki Holi is also known as Nirvan Ki Holi or Holi of Salvation.

Cultural Hubs
Almora- Almora is considered the cultural capital of Kumaon. It is also known as the "Heart of Kumaon".

Nainital- Nainital is by far the most well known tourist destination of Kumaon. The city has played a major role in exporting the Kumaoni culture to the rest of India.

Pithoragarh- The city is known for its distinctive and unique culture. It has been one of the major hubs of Kumaoni culture and is the largest city in the hills of Kumaon.
Champawat- Also known as Kali Kumaon, Champawat is the root of Kumaoni culture. It is from this place Kumaon got its name.
Bageshwar- Bageshwar is known as "Kumaok Kashi" (Kumaon's Kashi), because of the holy Saryu flowing through it. Bageshwar is the home to the largest Kumaoni fair "Uttarayini".
Haldwani- Though it is situated in Bhabhar, Haldwani has played a very significant role in shaping Kumaon's history and culture. It is Kumaon's largest city and has recently become a hub of artists, who are promoting Kumaoni language and culture.
Rudrapur- Rudrapur is undoubtedly Kumaon's most cosmopolitan city, with a significant presence of Punjabi, Bengali and other migrants. However, Kumaonis form a large part of the city. Rudrapur is known as Kumaon's Financial Capital.

GI Tag

Kumaon's culture has also got recognition. Many of its cultural heritage like Aipan Art, has got GI Tag.

Religious significance
In Kumaon, every peak, lake or mountain range is somehow or the other connected with some myth or the name of a God or Goddess, ranging from those associated with the Shaiva, Shakta and Vaishnava traditions, to local Gods like Bambai Nath Swami, Haim, Saim, Golu, Nanda, Sunanda, Chhurmal, Kail Bisht, Bholanath, Gangnath, Airi and Chaumu. Referring to the rich religious myths and lores associated with Kumaon, E. T. Atkinson has said: 'To the beliefs of the great majority of Hindus, the Kumaon is what Palestine is to the Christians.

Economy

Kumaon is home to the financial capital of the state, I.e., Haldwani. Kumaon has the state's most commercial, economic and industrial activities specially in Bhabar and Terai regions. Along with Industries there is a huge tourism sector. Agriculture also plays a huge role in Kumaoni
economy. It employs a large percentage of Kumaoni population.

Economic Hubs 
Haldwani- Being the largest city of Kumaon, and the gateway of Kumaon, Haldwani is the financial centre of Kumaon. It is often dubbed as the financial capital, having the most commercial activity of the state.
Rudrapur- Rudrapur has established itself as a significant trading center within the Udham Singh Nagar district, which itself is a big trading center in Kumaon. The district exports include industrial as well as agricultural products, both of which are predominantly channeled from Rudrapur. The Basmati rice from Rudrapur is among the top crop which is produced in the region. Post the setup of State Infrastructure and Industrial Development Corporation of Uttarakhand Limited (SIDCUL), enhanced by the broad-gauge railway network in the area, Rudrapur has developed into an industrial city with its city limits expanding to accommodate new residential demands of the workers and professionals moving into the area.

Tourism Sector 

Being a Himalayan state, Kumaon do have a huge Tourism industry. The major tourism hubs include-

 Lakes of Kumaon: Nainital, Bhimtal, Sattal, Naukuchiatal attract a lot of people from within the country and abroad.
 National Parks: Jim Corbett National Park, is the most famous National Park of Kumaon. Binsar Wildlife Sanctuary and Askot Deer Sanctuary are other protected areas of Kumaon.
 Hill Stations:  Pithoragarh, Nainital, Almora, Kasar, Chaukori, Kausani, Munsiyari, Lohaghat, Ramnagar, Mukteshwar, Ranikhet are some of the most famous Hill stations of Kumaon.

Agriculture

Basmati rice, Red rice, wheat, Ragi(Madua in Kumaoni), soybeans, groundnuts, coarse cereals, pulses, and oil seeds are the most widely grown crops. Fruits like apples, oranges, pears, peaches, lychees, and plums are widely grown and are important to the large food processing industry. Ramgarh, in Nainital District, specially, is famous for its fruits. It is often referred to as the 'Fruit Bowl of Kumaon'.

Tea is also cultivated in Berinag, Bhowali, Champawat and Lohaghat.  Berinag tea being specially famous for its taste. Champawat's tea is sold by the name "Kumaon Black Tea".

Munisyari is very famous for its 'White Rajma' which has also got GI Tag.
Additionally Kumaon is also famous for Chyura oil(Kumaoni: Chyūrek tēl). Chuyra Oil has aso got GI Certification. Apart from these two Copper work 'tamra' which are speciality of Almora have also got GI Tag.

Administrative Subdivisions

Cities

Languages

The main language used in administration and education is Hindi, which according to the 2011 census is the first language of well over a million of the region's inhabitants (mostly concentrated in the south). The major native language, however, is Kumaoni, spoken by about 2 million people. In the southern districts there are also sizeable numbers of speakers of Punjabi, Urdu and Bengali, while the two related languages of Buksa and Rana Tharu are found in the southernmost Udham Singh Nagar district. The higher mountains in the north of Kumaon are home to the Sino-Tibetan Byangsi, Chaudangsi, Darmiya, Raji, Rawat and Rangas (the last now extinct).

The community radio station Kumaon Vani has been broadcasting over the region since 2010.

See also
 List of Kumaonis
 Martial race
 Iris kumaonensis (Plant species of the Iris genus from the region)
Garhwal division

Further reading

References

 A New History of Uttrakhand by Dr. Y. S. Kathoch

External links 

 Official site of Kumaon Mandal Vikas Nigam (KMVN) for tourist information
 Brief history of Kumaon

 
Divisions of Uttarakhand